Sir Frank Godbould Lee  (26 August 1903 – 23 April 1971) was a British public servant and Master of Corpus Christi College, Cambridge.

Lee was born in Colchester, Essex, in 1903 and educated at Brentwood School and Downing College, Cambridge, where he read English. After Cambridge he joined the civil service in the Colonial Office where he stayed from 1926 until 1940. He then moved to the Treasury and was Permanent Secretary to the Ministry of Food when he was knighted in January 1950. In 1951 he became Permanent Secretary to the Board of Trade, before eventually moving back to the Treasury and becoming Joint Permanent Secretary.

In 1958, he delivered the Stamp memorial lecture, on the subject of The Board of Trade, which was subsequently published as a monograph by The University of London.

On 2 October 1962 he was made a privy councillor.

He retired from the civil service in 1962 and was appointed Master of Corpus Christi College Cambridge, a post he held until his death in 1971.

The Frank Lee Leisure Centre in Cambridge is named in his honour.

References

 
 

1903 births
1971 deaths
Alumni of Downing College, Cambridge
Fellows of Corpus Christi College, Cambridge
Knights Commander of the Order of the Bath
Knights Grand Cross of the Order of St Michael and St George
Masters of Corpus Christi College, Cambridge
Members of the Privy Council of the United Kingdom
People associated with the University of East Anglia
People educated at Brentwood School, Essex
Permanent Secretaries of the Board of Trade
Permanent Secretaries of HM Treasury
Permanent Secretaries of the Ministry of Food